International Workshop on Operator Theory and its Applications (IWOTA) was started in 1981  to bring together mathematicians and engineers working in operator theoretic side of functional analysis and its applications to related fields.  These include:

 Differential equations and Integral equations
 Complex analysis and Harmonic analysis
 Linear system and Control theory
 Mathematical physics
 Signal processing
 Numerical analysis

The other major branch of operator theory, Operator algebras (C* and von Neumann Algebras), is not heavily represented at IWOTA and has its own conferences.

IWOTA gathers leading experts from all over the world for an intense exchange of new results, information and opinions, and for tracing the future developments in the field.  The IWOTA meetings provide opportunities for participants (including young researchers) to present their own work in invited and contributed talks, to interact with other researchers from around the globe, and to broaden their knowledge of the field. 
In addition, IWOTA emphasizes cross-disciplinary interaction among mathematicians, electrical engineers and mathematical physicists. In the even years, the IWOTA workshop is a satellite meeting to the biennial International Symposium on the Mathematical Theory of Networks and Systems (MTNS). From the humble beginnings in the early 80's, the IWOTA workshops grew to become one of the largest continuing conferences attended by the community of researchers in operator theory.

History of IWOTA

First IWOTA Meeting
The International Workshop on Operator Theory and its Applications was started on August 1, 1981, adjacent to the International Symposium on Mathematical Theory of Networks and Systems (MTNS) with goal of exposing operator theorists, even pure theorists, to recent developments in engineering (especially H-infinity methods in control theory) which had a significant intersection with operator theory. Israel Gohberg was the visionary and driving force of IWOTA and president of the IWOTA Steering Committee. From the beginning, J. W. Helton and M. A. Kaashoek served as vice presidents of the steering committee.

West Meets East
Besides the excitement of mathematical discovery over the decades at IWOTA, there was great excitement when the curtain between Soviet bloc and Western operator theorists fell. Until 1990, these two collections of extremely strong mathematicians seldom met due to the tight restrictions on travel from and in the communist countries. When the curtain dropped, the western mathematicians knew the classic Soviet papers but had a spotty knowledge of much of what else their counterparts were doing. Gohberg was one of the operator theorists who knew both sides and he guided IWOTA, a western institution, in bringing (and funding) many prominent FSU bloc operator theorists to speak at the meetings. As the IWOTA programs demonstrate, this significantly accelerated the cultures' mutual assimilation.

Previous IWOTA Meetings

IWOTA Proceedings
Proceedings of the IWOTA workshops appear in the Springer / Birkhäuser Verlag book series Operator Theory: Advances and Applications (OTAA) (founder: Israel Gohberg). While engineering conference proceedings often are handed to participants as they arrive and contain short papers on each conference talk, the IWOTA proceedings follow mathematics conference tradition and contain a modest number of papers and are published several years after the conference.

Funding Sources
IWOTA has received support from many sources, including the National Science Foundation

, the London Mathematical Society, the Engineering and Physical Sciences Research Council, Deutsche Forschungsgemeinschaft, Secretaría de Estado de Investigación, Desarrollo e Innovación (Spain), Australian Mathematical Sciences Institute, National Board for Higher Mathematics, International Centre for Theoretical Physics, Indian Statistical Institute, Korea Research Foundation, United States-India Science & Technology Endowment Fund, Nederlandse Organisatie voor Wetenschappelijk Onderzoek, the Commission for Developing Countries of the International Mathematical Union, Stichting Advancement of Mathematics (Netherlands), the National Research Foundation of South Africa, and  Birkhäuser Publishing Ltd.

The IWOTA Steering Committee
IWOTA is directed by a steering committee which chooses the site for the next meeting, elects the chief local organizer(s) and insures the appearance of the enduring themes of IWOTA. The sub-themes of an IWOTA workshop and the lecturers are chosen by the local organizing committee after hearing the steering committee's board. The board consists of its vice presidents: Joseph A. Ball, J. William Helton (Chair), Sanne ter Horst, M. A. Kaashoek, Igor Klep, Christiane Tretter, Irene Sabadini, Victor Vinnikov and Hugo J. Woerdeman. In addition, past chief organizers who remain active in IWOTA are members of the steering committee. The board governs IWOTA with consultation and the consent of the full steering committee. Honorary members of the steering committee, elected in 2016, are: Israel Gohberg (deceased), Leiba Rodman (deceased), Tsuyoshi Ando, Harry Dym,  Ciprian Foiaş (deceased), Heinz Langer, Nikolai Nikolski.

Future IWOTA Meetings
 IWOTA 2023 will be held at University of Helsinki in Helsinki, Finland. Main organizer is Jani Virtanen. Dates are July 31 - August 4, 2023
 IWOTA 2024 will be held at University of Kent in Canterbury, United Kingdom. Main organizer is Ian Wood. Dates are August 12-16, 2024

Israel Gohberg ILAS-IWOTA Lecture

The Israel Gohberg ILAS-IWOTA Lecture was introduced in August 2016 and honors the legacy of Israel Gohberg, whose research crossed borders between operator theory, linear algebra, and related fields. This lecture is in collaboration with the International Linear Algebra Society (ILAS). This series of lectures will be delivered at IWOTA and ILAS Conferences, in different years, in the approximate ratio two-thirds at IWOTA and one-third at ILAS. The first three lectures will take place at IWOTA Lancaster UK 2021, ILAS 2022, and IWOTA 2024. Donations for the Israel Gohberg ILAS-IWOTA Lecture Fund are most welcome and can be submitted via the ILAS donation form. Donations are tax deductible in the United States.

References

External links
 Operator Theory: Advances and Applications Series on Springer website
 IWOTA's YouTube Channel
 IWOTA 2000 - Bordeaux, France
 IWOTA 2006 - Seoul, Korea
 IWOTA 2007 - Potchefstroom, South Africa
 IWOTA 2008 - Williamsburg, Virginia, U.S.A
 IWOTA 2010 - Berlin, Germany
 IWOTA 2011 - Seville, Spain
 IWOTA 2012 - Sydney, Australia
 IWOTA 2013 - Bangalore, India
 IWOTA 2014 - Amsterdam, Netherlands
 IWOTA 2015 - Tbilisi, Georgia
 IWOTA 2016 - St. Louis, Missouri, USA
 IWOTA 2017 - Chemnitz, Germany
 IWOTA 2019 - Lisbon, Portugal
 IWOTA Chapman USA 2021 - Orange, California, USA
 IWOTA Lancaster UK 2021 - Lancaster, United Kingdom
 IWOTA 2022 - Kraków, Poland
 IWOTA 2023 - Helsinki, Finland

Mathematics conferences
Operator theory
Functional analysis
Mathematical analysis
Mathematical societies
Organizations established in 1981